In radio, multiple-input and multiple-output, or MIMO, is a method for multiplying the capacity of a radio link using multiple transmission and receiving antennas to exploit multipath propagation. MIMO has become an essential element of wireless communication standards including IEEE 802.11n (Wi-Fi 4), IEEE 802.11ac (Wi-Fi 5), HSPA+ (3G), WiMAX, and Long Term Evolution (LTE). More recently, MIMO has been applied to power-line communication for three-wire installations as part of the ITU G.hn standard and of the HomePlug AV2 specification.

At one time, in wireless the term "MIMO" referred to the use of multiple antennas at the transmitter and the receiver. In modern usage, "MIMO" specifically refers to a class of techniques for sending and receiving more than one data signal simultaneously over the same radio channel by exploiting multipath propagation. Additionally, modern MIMO usage often refers to multiple data signals sent to different receivers (with one or more receive antennas) though this is more accurately termed multi-user multiple-input single-output (MU-MISO).

History

Early research 
MIMO is often traced back to 1970s research papers concerning multi-channel digital transmission systems and interference (crosstalk) between wire pairs in a cable bundle: AR Kaye and DA George (1970), Branderburg and Wyner (1974), and W. van Etten (1975, 1976). Although these are not examples of exploiting multipath propagation to send multiple information streams, some of the mathematical techniques for dealing with mutual interference proved useful to MIMO development. In the mid-1980s Jack Salz at Bell Laboratories  took this research a step further, investigating multi-user systems operating over "mutually cross-coupled linear networks with additive noise sources" such as time-division multiplexing and dually-polarized radio systems.

Methods were developed to improve the performance of cellular radio networks and enable more aggressive frequency reuse in the early 1990s. Space-division multiple access (SDMA) uses directional or smart antennas to communicate on the same frequency with users in different locations within range of the same base station. An SDMA system was proposed by Richard Roy and Björn Ottersten, researchers at ArrayComm, in 1991. Their US patent (No. 5515378 issued in 1996) describes a method for increasing capacity using "an array of receiving antennas at the base station" with a "plurality of remote users."

Invention 
Arogyaswami Paulraj and Thomas Kailath proposed an SDMA-based inverse multiplexing technique in 1993. Their US patent (No. 5,345,599 issued in 1994) described a method of broadcasting at high data rates by splitting a high-rate signal "into several low-rate signals" to be transmitted from "spatially separated transmitters" and recovered by the receive antenna array based on differences in "directions-of-arrival." Paulraj was awarded the prestigious Marconi Prize in 2014 for "his pioneering contributions to developing the theory and applications of MIMO antennas. ...  His idea for using multiple antennas at both the transmitting and receiving stations – which is at the heart of the current high speed WiFi and 4G mobile systems – has revolutionized high speed wireless."

In an April 1996 paper and subsequent patent, Greg Raleigh proposed that natural multipath propagation can be exploited to transmit multiple, independent information streams using co-located antennas and multi-dimensional signal processing. The paper also identified practical solutions for modulation (MIMO-OFDM), coding, synchronization, and channel estimation. Later that year (September 1996) Gerard J. Foschini submitted a paper that also suggested it is possible to multiply the capacity of a wireless link using what the author described as "layered space-time architecture."

Greg Raleigh, V. K. Jones, and Michael Pollack founded Clarity Wireless in 1996, and built and field-tested a prototype MIMO system. Cisco Systems acquired Clarity Wireless in 1998. Bell Labs built a laboratory prototype demonstrating its V-BLAST (Vertical-Bell Laboratories Layered Space-Time) technology in 1998. Arogyaswami Paulraj founded Iospan Wireless in late 1998 to develop MIMO-OFDM products. Iospan was acquired by Intel in 2003. V-BLAST was never commercialized, and neither Clarity Wireless nor Iospan Wireless shipped MIMO-OFDM products before being acquired.

Standards and commercialization 

MIMO technology has been standardized for wireless LANs, 3G mobile phone networks, and 4G mobile phone networks and is now in widespread commercial use. Greg Raleigh and V. K. Jones founded Airgo Networks in 2001 to develop MIMO-OFDM chipsets for wireless LANs. The Institute of Electrical and Electronics Engineers (IEEE) created a task group in late 2003 to develop a wireless LAN standard delivering at least 100 Mbit/s of user data throughput. There were two major competing proposals: TGn Sync was backed by companies including Intel and Philips, and WWiSE was supported by companies including Airgo Networks, Broadcom, and Texas Instruments. Both groups agreed that the 802.11n standard would be based on MIMO-OFDM with 20 MHz and 40 MHz channel options.  TGn Sync, WWiSE, and a third proposal (MITMOT, backed by Motorola and Mitsubishi) were merged to create what was called the Joint Proposal. In 2004, Airgo became the first company to ship MIMO-OFDM products. Qualcomm acquired Airgo Networks in late 2006. The final 802.11n standard supported speeds up to 600 Mbit/s (using four simultaneous data streams) and was published in late 2009.

Surendra Babu Mandava and Arogyaswami Paulraj founded Beceem Communications in 2004 to produce MIMO-OFDM chipsets for WiMAX. The company was acquired by Broadcom in 2010. WiMAX was developed as an alternative to cellular standards, is based on the 802.16e standard, and uses MIMO-OFDM to deliver speeds up to 138 Mbit/s. The more advanced 802.16m standard enables download speeds up to 1 Gbit/s. A nationwide WiMAX network was built in the United States by Clearwire, a subsidiary of Sprint-Nextel, covering 130 million points of presence (PoP) by mid-2012. Sprint subsequently announced plans to deploy LTE (the cellular 4G standard) covering 31 cities by mid-2013 and to shut down its WiMAX network by the end of 2015.

The first 4G cellular standard was proposed by NTT DoCoMo in 2004. Long term evolution (LTE) is based on MIMO-OFDM and continues to be developed by the 3rd Generation Partnership Project (3GPP). LTE specifies downlink rates up to 300 Mbit/s, uplink rates up to 75 Mbit/s, and quality of service parameters such as low latency. LTE Advanced adds support for picocells, femtocells, and multi-carrier channels up to 100 MHz wide. LTE has been embraced by both GSM/UMTS and CDMA operators.

The first LTE services were launched in Oslo and Stockholm by TeliaSonera in 2009. As of 2015, there were more than 360 LTE networks in 123 countries operational with approximately 373 million connections (devices).

Functions 
MIMO can be sub-divided into three main categories: precoding, spatial multiplexing (SM), and diversity coding.

Precoding is multi-stream beamforming, in the narrowest definition. In more general terms, it is considered to be all spatial processing that occurs at the transmitter. In (single-stream) beamforming, the same signal is emitted from each of the transmit antennas with appropriate phase and gain weighting such that the signal power is maximized at the receiver input. The benefits of beamforming are to increase the received signal gain – by making signals emitted from different antennas add up constructively – and to reduce the multipath fading effect. In line-of-sight propagation, beamforming results in a well-defined directional pattern. However, conventional beams are not a good analogy in cellular networks, which are mainly characterized by multipath propagation. When the receiver has multiple antennas, the transmit beamforming cannot simultaneously maximize the signal level at all of the receive antennas, and precoding with multiple streams is often beneficial. Note that precoding requires knowledge of channel state information (CSI) at the transmitter and the receiver.

Spatial multiplexing requires MIMO antenna configuration. In spatial multiplexing, a high-rate signal is split into multiple lower-rate streams and each stream is transmitted from a different transmit antenna in the same frequency channel. If these signals arrive at the receiver antenna array with sufficiently different spatial signatures and the receiver has accurate CSI, it can separate these streams into (almost) parallel channels. Spatial multiplexing is a very powerful technique for increasing channel capacity at higher signal-to-noise ratios (SNR). The maximum number of spatial streams is limited by the lesser of the number of antennas at the transmitter or receiver. Spatial multiplexing can be used without CSI at the transmitter, but can be combined with precoding if CSI is available. Spatial multiplexing can also be used for simultaneous transmission to multiple receivers, known as space-division multiple access or multi-user MIMO, in which case CSI is required at the transmitter. The scheduling of receivers with different spatial signatures allows good separability.

Diversity coding techniques are used when there is no channel knowledge at the transmitter. In diversity methods, a single stream (unlike multiple streams in spatial multiplexing) is transmitted, but the signal is coded using techniques called space-time coding. The signal is emitted from each of the transmit antennas with full or near orthogonal coding. Diversity coding exploits the independent fading in the multiple antenna links to enhance signal diversity. Because there is no channel knowledge, there is no beamforming or array gain from diversity coding.
Diversity coding can be combined with spatial multiplexing when some channel knowledge is available at the receiver.

Forms

Multi-antenna types 
Multi-antenna MIMO (or single-user MIMO) technology has been developed and implemented in some standards, e.g., 802.11n products.
 SISO/SIMO/MISO are special cases of MIMO.
 Multiple-input single-output (MISO) is a special case when the receiver has a single antenna.
 Single-input multiple-output (SIMO) is a special case when the transmitter has a single antenna.
 Single-input single-output (SISO) is a conventional radio system where neither transmitter nor receiver has multiple antennas.
 Principal single-user MIMO techniques
 Bell Laboratories Layered Space-Time (BLAST), Gerard. J. Foschini (1996)
 Per Antenna Rate Control (PARC), Varanasi, Guess (1998), Chung, Huang, Lozano (2001)
 Selective Per Antenna Rate Control (SPARC), Ericsson (2004)
 Some limitations
 The physical antenna spacing is selected to be large; multiple wavelengths at the base station. The antenna separation at the receiver is heavily space-constrained in handsets, though advanced antenna design and algorithm techniques are under discussion. Refer to: multi-user MIMO

Multi-user types 

Recently, results of research on multi-user MIMO technology have been emerging. While full multi-user MIMO (or network MIMO) can have a higher potential, practically, the research on (partial) multi-user MIMO (or multi-user and multi-antenna MIMO) technology is more active.
 Multi-user MIMO (MU-MIMO)
 In recent 3GPP and WiMAX standards, MU-MIMO is being treated as one of the candidate technologies adoptable in the specification by a number of companies, including Samsung, Intel, Qualcomm, Ericsson, TI, Huawei, Philips, Nokia, and Freescale. For these and other firms active in the mobile hardware market, MU-MIMO is more feasible for low-complexity cell phones with a small number of reception antennas, whereas single-user SU-MIMO's higher per-user throughput is better suited to more complex user devices with more antennas.
 Enhanced multiuser MIMO: 1) Employs advanced decoding techniques, 2) Employs advanced precoding techniques
 SDMA represents either space-division multiple access or super-division multiple access where super emphasises that orthogonal division such as frequency- and time-division is not used but non-orthogonal approaches such as superposition coding are used.
 Cooperative MIMO (CO-MIMO)
 Uses multiple neighboring base stations to jointly transmit/receive data to/from users. As a result, neighboring base stations don't cause intercell interference as in the conventional MIMO systems.
 Macrodiversity MIMO
 A form of space diversity scheme which uses multiple transmit or receive base stations for communicating coherently with single or multiple users which are possibly distributed in the coverage area, in the same time and frequency resource.
 The transmitters are far apart in contrast to traditional microdiversity MIMO schemes such as single-user MIMO. In a multi-user macrodiversity MIMO scenario, users may also be far apart. Therefore, every constituent link in the virtual MIMO link has distinct average link SNR. This difference is mainly due to the different long-term channel impairments such as path loss and shadow fading which are experienced by different links.
 Macrodiversity MIMO schemes pose unprecedented theoretical and practical challenges. Among many theoretical challenges, perhaps the most fundamental challenge is to understand how the different average link SNRs affect the overall system capacity and individual user performance in fading environments.
 MIMO Routing
 Routing a cluster by a cluster in each hop, where the number of nodes in each cluster is larger or equal to one. MIMO routing is different from conventional (SISO) routing since conventional routing protocols route node-by-node in each hop.
 Massive MIMO
 A technology where the number of terminals is much less than the number of base station (mobile station) antennas. In a rich scattering environment, the full advantages of the massive MIMO system can be exploited using simple beamforming strategies such as maximum ratio transmission (MRT), maximum ratio-combining (MRC) or zero forcing (ZF). To achieve these benefits of massive MIMO, accurate CSI must be available perfectly. However, in practice, the channel between the transmitter and receiver is estimated from orthogonal pilot sequences which are limited by the coherence time of the channel. Most importantly, in a multicell setup, the reuse of pilot sequences of several co-channel cells will create pilot contamination. When there is pilot contamination, the performance of massive MIMO degrades quite drastically. To alleviate the effect of pilot contamination, Tadilo E. Bogale and Long B. Le propose a simple pilot assignment and channel estimation method from limited training sequences. However, in 2018, research by Emil Björnson, Jakob Hoydis, and Luca Sanguinetti was published which shows that pilot contamination is solvable and that the capacity of a channel can always be increased, both in theory and in practice, by increasing the number of antennas.

Applications 

Third Generation (3G) (CDMA and UMTS) allows for implementing space-time transmit diversity schemes, in combination with transmit beamforming at base stations. Fourth Generation (4G) LTE And LTE Advanced define very advanced air interfaces extensively relying on MIMO techniques. LTE primarily focuses on single-link MIMO relying on SpatialMultiplexing and space-time coding while LTE-Advanced further extends the design to multi-user MIMO. In wireless local area networks (WLAN), the IEEE 802.11n (Wi-Fi), MIMO technology is implemented in the standard using three different techniques: antenna selection, space-time coding and possibly beamforming.

Spatial multiplexing techniques make the receivers very complex, and therefore they are typically combined with orthogonal frequency-division multiplexing (OFDM) or with orthogonal frequency-division multiple access (OFDMA) modulation, where the problems created by a multi-path channel are handled efficiently. The IEEE 802.16e standard incorporates MIMO-OFDMA. The IEEE 802.11n standard, released in October 2009, recommends MIMO-OFDM.

MIMO is also planned to be used in mobile radio telephone standards such as recent 3GPP and 3GPP2. In 3GPP, High-Speed Packet Access plus (HSPA+) and Long Term Evolution (LTE) standards take MIMO into account. Moreover, to fully support cellular environments, MIMO research consortia including IST-MASCOT propose to develop advanced MIMO techniques, e.g., multi-user MIMO (MU-MIMO).

MIMO wireless communications architectures and processing techniques can be applied to sensing problems. This is studied in a sub-discipline called MIMO radar.

MIMO technology can be used in non-wireless communications systems. One example is the home networking standard ITU-T G.9963, which defines a powerline communications system that uses MIMO techniques to transmit multiple signals over multiple AC wires (phase, neutral and ground).

Mathematical description 

In MIMO systems, a transmitter sends multiple streams by multiple transmit antennas. The transmit streams go through a matrix channel which consists of all  paths between the  transmit antennas at the transmitter and  receive antennas at the receiver. Then, the receiver gets the received signal vectors by the multiple receive antennas and decodes the received signal vectors into the original information. A narrowband flat fading MIMO system is modelled as:

Referring to information theory, the ergodic channel capacity of MIMO systems where both the transmitter and the receiver have perfect instantaneous channel state information is

The optimal signal covariance  is achieved through singular value decomposition of the channel matrix  and an optimal diagonal power allocation matrix . The optimal power allocation is achieved through waterfilling, that is

If the transmitter has only statistical channel state information, then the ergodic channel capacity will decrease as the signal covariance  can only be optimized in terms of the average mutual information as

The spatial correlation of the channel has a strong impact on the ergodic channel capacity with statistical information.

If the transmitter has no channel state information it can select the signal covariance  to maximize channel capacity under worst-case statistics, which means  and accordingly

Depending on the statistical properties of the channel, the ergodic capacity is no greater than  times larger than that of a SISO system.

MIMO detection
One of the main problems in MIMO is knowing the channel matrix  at the receiver. In practice, in communication systems, the transmitter sends a Pilot signal and the receiver learns the state of the channel (i.e.) from the received signal  and the Pilot signal . There are several algorithms for estimating  from multiple received signals  and the Pilot signal , such as zero-forcing, successive interference cancellation a.k.a. V-blast, Maximum likelihood estimation (assuming the noise is Gaussian) and recently, Neural network MIMO Detection. As the number of antennas at the transmitter and receiver grows, the MIMO detection problem becomes more difficult and the Neural network approach becomes superior, especially in the presence of impairments.

Testing 
MIMO signal testing focuses first on the transmitter/receiver system. The random phases of the sub-carrier signals can produce instantaneous power levels that cause the amplifier to compress, momentarily causing distortion and ultimately symbol errors. Signals with a high PAR (peak-to-average ratio) can cause amplifiers to compress unpredictably during transmission. OFDM signals are very dynamic and compression problems can be hard to detect because of their noise-like nature.

Knowing the quality of the signal channel is also critical. A channel emulator can simulate how a device performs at the cell edge, can add noise or can simulate what the channel looks like at speed. To fully qualify the performance of a receiver, a calibrated transmitter, such as a vector signal generator (VSG), and channel emulator can be used to test the receiver under a variety of different conditions. Conversely, the transmitter's performance under a number of different conditions can be verified using a channel emulator and a calibrated receiver, such as a vector signal analyzer (VSA).

Understanding the channel allows for manipulation of the phase and amplitude of each transmitter in order to form a beam. To correctly form a beam, the transmitter needs to understand the characteristics of the channel. This process is called channel sounding or channel estimation. A known signal is sent to the mobile device that enables it to build a picture of the channel environment. The mobile device sends back the channel characteristics to the transmitter. The transmitter can then apply the correct phase and amplitude adjustments to form a beam directed at the mobile device. This is called a closed-loop MIMO system. For beamforming, it is required to adjust the phases and amplitude of each transmitter. In a beamformer optimized for spatial diversity or spatial multiplexing, each antenna element simultaneously transmits a weighted combination of two data symbols.

Literature

Principal researchers 
Papers by Gerard J. Foschini and Michael J. Gans, Foschini and Emre Telatar have shown that the channel capacity (a theoretical upper bound on system throughput) for a MIMO system is increased as the number of antennas is increased, proportional to the smaller of the number of transmit antennas and the number of receive antennas. This is known as the multiplexing gain and this basic finding in information theory is what led to a spurt of research in this area. Despite the simple propagation models used in the aforementioned seminal works, the multiplexing gain is a fundamental property that can be proved under almost any physical channel propagation model and with practical hardware that is prone to transceiver impairments.

Papers by Dr. Fernando Rosas and Dr. Christian Oberli  have shown that the entire MIMO SVD link can be approximated by the average of the SER of Nakagami-m channels. This leads to characterising the eigenchannels of N × N MIMO channels with N larger than 14, showing that the smallest eigenchannel distributes as a Rayleigh channel, the next four eigenchannels closely distributes as Nakagami-m channels with m = 4, 9, 25 and 36, and the N – 5 remaining eigenchannels have statistics similar to an additive white Gaussian noise (AWGN) channel within 1 dB signal-to-noise ratio. It is also shown that 75% of the total mean power gain of the MIMO SVD channel goes to the top third of all the eigenchannels.

A textbook by A. Paulraj, R. Nabar and D. Gore has published an introduction to this area. There are many other principal textbooks available as well.

Diversity–multiplexing tradeoff 
There exists a fundamental tradeoff between transmit diversity and spatial multiplexing gains in a MIMO system (Zheng and Tse, 2003). In particular, achieving high spatial multiplexing gains is of profound importance in modern wireless systems.

Other applications 
Given the nature of MIMO, it is not limited to wireless communication. It can be used for wire line communication as well. For example, a new type of DSL technology (gigabit DSL) has been proposed based on binder MIMO channels.

Sampling theory in MIMO systems 
An important question which attracts the attention of engineers and mathematicians is how to use the multi-output signals at the receiver to recover the multi-input signals at the transmitter. In Shang, Sun and Zhou (2007), sufficient and necessary conditions are established to guarantee the complete recovery of the multi-input signals.

See also 

 Antenna diversity
 Beamforming
 Channel bonding
 Channel state information
 Dirty paper coding
 Duplex (telecommunications)
 History of smart antennas
 IEEE 802.11
 IEEE 802.16
 Macrodiversity
 MIMO-OFDM
 Multi-user MIMO
 Per-User Unitary Rate Control
 Phased array
 Precoding
 Single-frequency network (SFN)
 Smart antenna
 Space–time block code
 Space–time code
 Spatial multiplexing
 Wi-Fi
 WiMAX MIMO

References

External links 
 NIST UWB-MIMO Channel Propagation Measurements in the 2–8 GHz Spectrum
 Literature review of MIMO
 Antenna and Wireless Multipath Virtual Channel Interaction

IEEE 802
Information theory
Radio resource management
Control engineering